Buzema is an oasis in the Libyan Desert in the Kufra District of Libya, about 150 km northwest of Kufra. It has a surface of 230 km2 and stretches with a semicircular shape around an 18 km long salt lake. Buzema lies to the bottom of a mountain range where the remains of a Toubou fortification system are still visible. The oasis trees (palm, fig, tamarisk, acacia) bear a lot of fruit due to the abundance of fresh water. On the northwest shore of the lake lies a village.

Further reading

References

Oases of Libya
Populated places in Kufra District
Cyrenaica